Earl Hauge (October 18, 1940) was an American politician and Lutheran minister.

Hauge lived in Glenwood, Minnesota with his wife and family. He received his bachelor's degree in political science and history from Concordia College in Moorhead, Minnesota and his doctorate degree from Luther Seminary in Saint Paul, Minnesota. Hauge served as a Lutheran minister in Watson, Minnesota from 1967 to 1973. He served in the Minnesota House of Representatives in 1981 and 1982 and was a  Democrat.

References

1940 births
Living people
People from Glenwood, Minnesota
Luther Seminary alumni
Concordia College (Moorhead, Minnesota) alumni
20th-century American Lutheran clergy
Democratic Party members of the Minnesota House of Representatives